Austrocidaria similata is a species of moth of the family Geometridae. It endemic to New Zealand.

Taxonomy 
It was first described by Francis Walker in 1862 using a specimen obtained by William Colenso and named Cidaria similata.  The holotype specimen is held at the Natural History Museum, London.

Distribution 
A. similata is endemic to New Zealand. This species is found on the Auckland Islands, Campbell Island, Snares Islands, the Chatham Islands and mainland New Zealand, Stewart Island and Codfish Island.

Biology and behaviour 

Adults are on wing in December, February, May and September. The larvae feed on Coprosma species.

References

External links

Holotype specimen of species

Xanthorhoini
Moths of New Zealand
Moths described in 1862
Endemic fauna of New Zealand
Taxa named by Francis Walker (entomologist)
Endemic moths of New Zealand